This is a list of shows broadcast by C/S.

Programs

Procedural drama
 Bones
 Burn Notice
 The Closer
 Cold Case
 The Dresden Files
 Eleventh Hour
 Fringe
 In Plain Sight
 K-Ville
 The Kill Point
 Law & Order
 Law and Order: Criminal Intent
 Law and Order: Special Victims Unit
 Life
 Medium
 The Mentalist
 NCIS
 Oz
 Saving Grace
 Shark
 The Sopranos
 Without a Trace

Comedy series
 Chuck
 Psych

Reality
 Survivor: Samoa
 To Catch a Predator

Documentary/factuals
 7 Deadly Hollywood Sins
 Body of Evidence
 City Confidential
 Cold Case Files
 Crime and Punishment
 Crime Scene Academy
 Crime Seen
 Crime Stories
 Dominick Dunne: Power, Privilege, & Justice
 Extreme Evidence
 Final Justice with Erin Brockovich
 The First 48
 Forensic Files
 Hollywood Justice
 I Detective
 Investigative Reports
 L.A. Detectives
 Masterminds
 North Mission Road
 Psychic Detectives
 The Takedown
 What Should You Do?

News, talk and infotainment
 Boses
 Dial-M
 Ikaw at Ang Batas
 Late Show with David Letterman
 Malacanang Press Conference
 NBC Nightly News
 One Morning Cafe
 RPN iWatch News
 RPN NewsCap
 RPN NewsWatch
 RPN NewsWatch Aksyon Balita
 RPN NewsWatch Junior Edition
 RPN NewsWatch Update
 RPN News Update
 Sagip Bayan
 The Working President

Movie block
 C/S Movie Mania

Sports
 Beijing Olympics on C/S Sports
 NBA
 PBA on C/S9
 UAAP on C/S9
 NCAA on C/S9
 The Main Events
 WWE on C/S Sports
 WWE ECW
 WWE Pay-Per-View Special
 WWE Raw
 WWE SmackDown

From C/S 9 and C/S Origin
 Battlestar Galactica (2004)
 Bionic Woman
 Combat Missions
 Conviction
 Crossing Jordan
 E-Ring
 Eureka
 Firefly
 The Grid
 Heroes
 Hunter (2003)
 Invasion
 Jericho
 Kojak
 Law & Order: Trial by Jury
 The Law Firm
 Moonlight
 Murder, She Wrote
 Profiler
 Revelations
 Standoff
 Surface
 Survivor: China
 Survivor: Fiji
 Survivor: Gabon (*)
 Survivor: Tocantins (*)
 Terminator: The Sarah Connor Chronicles
 Thief
 Threshold
 Traffic
 Treasure Hunters
 Women's Murder Club
 The X-Files

(*) - The Survivor franchise originally aired on Studio 23 (laterly S+A now defunct) before its move to C/S. However, when GMA acquired the rights to air the Philippines' version of Survivor, sister station Q (laterly GMA News TV, now GTV seen on UHF 27) also acquired the rights to air the next Survivor TV series. Survivor: Gabon was first shown on September 26, 2008, while Survivor: Tocantins was shown on February 14, 2009, on C/S Origin. The franchise moved back entirely to Solar with the showing of Survivor: Samoa on C/S 9.

Lists of television series by network